The Kiwaian languages form a language family of New Guinea.  They are a dialect cluster of half a dozen closely related languages.  They are grammatically divergent from the Trans–New Guinea languages, and typically have singular, dual, trial, and plural pronouns.

Classification
The Trans–New Guinea identity of Kiwaiian is supported by a relatively large number of basic lexical items.  Ross (2005) tentatively linked Kiwaiian to the erstwhile language isolate Porome.  However, the evidence is only two pronouns, and the connection has not been accepted by other researchers.

Languages
 Kiwaian family: Kiwai, Bamu–Gama, Kerewo–Morigi, Waboda

Kiwaian languages and respective demographic information listed by Evans (2018) are provided below.

{| 
|+ List of Kiwaian languages
! Language !! Location !! Population !! Alternate names
|-
| Southern Kiwai || Kiwai Rural LLG || 20,000 || Island Kiwai
|-
| Wabuda || Kiwai Rural LLG || 2,750 || 
|-
| Bamu || south Bamu Rural LLG || 6,310 || 
|-
| Northeast Kiwai || West Kikori Rural LLG || 6,000 || Urama
|-
| Kerewo || West Kikori Rural LLG || 1,090 || 
|-
| Morigi || West Kikori Rural LLG || ? || 
|}

Proto-language

Phonemes
Usher (2020) reconstructs the consonant inventory as follows:

{| 
| *m || *n ||  || 
|-
| *p || *t || *s || *k 
|-
| *b || *d ||  || *g 
|-
| *w || *ɾ || || 
|}

{| 
| *i ||  || *u
|-
| *e || || *o
|-
| || *a ||
|}

Pronouns
Usher (2020) reconstructs the pronouns as,

{| 
! !!sg!!pl
|-
!1
|*mo||*nimo
|-
!2
|*oɾo||*nigo
|-
!3
| ?||*nei
|}

Basic vocabulary
Some lexical reconstructions by Usher (2020) are:

{| class="wikitable sortable"
! gloss !! Proto-Kiwai
|-
| head/hair || *kepuɾu
|-
| hair/feather || *mus[ua]
|-
| ear || *gaɾe
|-
| eye || *idomaɾi
|-
| nose || *wodi
|-
| tooth || *ibo(-nVɾV)
|-
| tongue || *uototoɾo[p/b]e
|-
| leg/foot || *sakiɾo
|-
| blood || *kaɾima; *sa[w]i
|-
| bone || *soɾo
|-
| skin/bark || *tama
|-
| breast || *amo
|-
| louse || *nimo
|-
| dog || *[k]umu
|-
| bird || *wowogo
|-
| egg/fruit || *kikopu
|-
| tree || *nuk₂a; *kota
|-
| man/male || *dubu
|-
| woman || *oɾobo; *upi
|-
| sun/day || *saɾik₂i; *si[w]io
|-
| moon || *sagomi; *owe
|-
| water || *kobo
|-
| fire || *keɾa
|-
| stone || *(nok₂oɾa-)kopi
|-
| path || *gabo
|-
| name || *paini, *paina
|-
| eat/drink || *oɾuso (sg.), *iɾiso (pl.)
|-
| one || *nak[o/u]
|-
| two || *netoa
|}

Evolution

Kiwaian reflexes of proto-Trans-New Guinea (pTNG) etyma are:

Southern Kiwai language:
magota ‘mouth’ < *maŋgat[a]
amo ‘breast < *amu
gare ‘ear’ < *kand(e,i)k(V]
pitu ‘fingernail’ < *mb(i,u)t(i,u)[C]
baba ‘father’ < *mbapa
sagana ‘moon’ < *takVn[V]
tuwo ‘ashes’ < *sumbu
era ‘tree’ < *inda
nimo ‘louse’ < *niman
epuru ‘head’ < *kV(mb,p)utu
kopu ‘short’ < *kutu(p,mb)a
abida ‘sister’ < *pi(n,nd)a

Other languages:
Waboda kepuru < *kV(mb,p)utu
Kerewo bena ‘shoulder’ < *mbena ‘arm’
Morigi kota ‘leg’ < *k(a,o)ndok[V]
N.E. Kiwai modi ‘nose’ < *mundu
Bamu kukamu ‘cold’ < *kukam(o,u)

References

Further reading
Wurm, S.A. "The Kiwaian Language Family". In Franklin, K. editor, The linguistic situation in the Gulf District and adjacent areas, Papua New Guinea. C-26:217-260. Pacific Linguistics, The Australian National University, 1973. 
Wurm, Stefan. 1951. Studies in the Kiwai Languages, Fly Delta, Papua, New Guinea. Wien: Herold.

External links 
 Timothy Usher, New Guinea World, Proto-Kiwai

 
Language families
Languages of Western Province (Papua New Guinea)
Languages of Gulf Province
Papuan languages